Robert McClelland may refer to:

Robert McClelland (American politician) (1807–1880), Governor of Michigan and U.S. Secretary of the Interior
Robert McClelland (Australian politician) (born 1958), former Australian Attorney-General
Robert Howard McClelland (born 1933), politician in British Columbia, Canada
Robert N. McClelland (1929–2019), American surgeon